Joseph Arthur Francis Spence is the current Master of Dulwich College. He was previously Headmaster of Oakham School and Master in College at Eton College.

Early life
Spence was born on 18 December 1959. He was educated at St Philip's School, a grammar school in Edgbaston, Birmingham, England, and at Salesian College, Battersea, a Roman Catholic school in Battersea, London. He studied modern history and politics at the University of Reading, graduating with a Bachelor of Arts (BA) degree. He then undertook postgraduate research at Birkbeck College, University of London, completing his Doctor of Philosophy (PhD) degree in 1991. His doctoral thesis was titled "The philosophy of Irish Toryism, 1833-52: a study of reactions to liberal reformism in Ireland in the generation between the first Reform Act and the Famine: with especial reference to expressions of national feeling among Protestant ascendancy".

Education career
From 1987 to 1992, Spence taught history and politics at Eton College, a public boys boarding school in Eton, Berkshire. He served as Master in College, responsible for the boarding house containing the King's Scholars, from 1992 to 2002. He then moved to Oakham School, a co-educational private school in Rutland, where he was Headmaster. In 2009, he became Master of Dulwich College, a boys private school in South London.

References

Masters of Dulwich College
Living people
Schoolteachers from Warwickshire
1959 births
Alumni of the University of Reading
Alumni of Birkbeck, University of London
Teachers at Eton College
People educated at St Philip's School